Iain Kevan Morris (born 6 August 1973) is an English writer. He is best known for creating The Inbetweeners with his writing partner Damon Beesley and co-hosting a show on London radio station XFM with stand-up comedian Jimmy Carr.

He featured in the "Iron" and "Music" episodes of cult spoof TV show Look Around You, as well as on Jimmy Carr's second live DVD, as a panelist on a feature named Comedy Idol. Other writing credits include two episodes of HBO's Flight of the Conchords: Season One's "The Actor" and Season Two's "Unnatural Love". Morris also co-wrote the screenplay alongside Taika Waititi for the 2023 sports comedy Next Goal Wins and co-scripted the football comedy series The First Team for the BBC in 2020.

Personal life
Morris was educated at Hampton School and studied theology at the University of Bristol.

Morris married American singer and DJ Marchelle Bradanini on 14 May 2011 in Palm Springs, California, United States.

Morris supports West London football club Queens Park Rangers.

References

External links
 

1973 births
Living people
21st-century British screenwriters
21st-century English comedians
21st-century English male writers
Alumni of the University of Bristol
Comedians from Surrey
English male comedians
English male screenwriters
English television writers
People from Woking